Siedel is a surname. Notable people with the surname include:
 Erhard Siedel (1895–1979), German actor
 George Siedel, American author and professor

See also
 Seidel (surname)